This is a listing of ships that fought at the Battle of Athos, 30 June 1807, during the Russo-Turkish War of 1806–1812. Spelling of Turkish ships is uncertain.

Imperial Russian Navy
Rafail 84
Selafail 74
Moshtchnyi 74
Tverdyi 74 (flag)
Skoryi 

Second line:
Silnyi
Uriil 84
Yaroslav 74
Retvizan 64 (flag 2)
Sv. Elena 74
750 guns total

Ottoman Turkish Navy
Masudiya 120 (flag)
Sadd al-bahr 84 (flag 2) - Captured 1 July
Anka-yi bahri 84
Taus i bahri 84
Tevfik-numa 84
Bisharet (or Biafaret?) 84 - Aground and scuttled 3 July
Kilid-i bahri 84
Sayyad-i bahri 74
Gulbang-i-Nusrat 74
Jebel-andaz 74

Frigates:
Meskeni-ghazi 50
Bedr-i zafar 50
Fakih-i zafar 50
Nessim 50 - Aground and scuttled 3 July
Iskenderiya 44
Sloops:
Metelin 32 - Aground and scuttled 3 July
Rahbar-i alam 28

Others:
Denyuvet? 32
Alamat i Nusrat 18
Melankai? 18
850 guns total

References

Napoleonic Wars orders of battle
Conflicts in 1807